Karl Köther (27 May 1905 – 27 January 1986) was a German cyclist. He won the bronze medal in Men's tandem in the 1928 Summer Olympics. His son, Karl, competed at the 1972 Summer Olympics.

References

1905 births
1986 deaths
German male cyclists
Olympic bronze medalists for Germany
Cyclists at the 1928 Summer Olympics
Olympic cyclists of Germany
Olympic medalists in cycling
Sportspeople from Hanover
Medalists at the 1928 Summer Olympics
Cyclists from Lower Saxony